Schönwalde may refer to the following places in Germany:

Schönwalde, Mecklenburg-Vorpommern, a municipality in the district Uecker-Randow, Mecklenburg-Vorpommern
Schönwalde, Saxony-Anhalt, a municipality in the district of Stendal, Saxony-Anhalt
Schönwalde am Bungsberg, a municipality in the district Ostholstein, Schleswig-Holstein 
Schönwalde-Glien, a municipality in the district Havelland, Brandenburg
Schönwalde, a village part of the municipality of Wandlitz in the district of Barnim, Brandenburg

See also
Schönwald (disambiguation)